Chaithoai Roaza (16 December 1930 – 9 January 1994) was a Bangladeshi politician from Rangamati.  He was a member of the Jatiya Sangsad.

Biography
Roaza was born on 16 December 1930 in Kawkhali, Rangamati. He provided financial help and arms to the freedom fighters of Chittagong during the Liberation War of Bangladesh. He was elected as a member of the Jatiya Sangsad from Chittagong Hill Tracts-2 as an independent candidate in 1973.

Roaza died on 9 January 1994 at the age of 63.

References

1930 births
1994 deaths
People from Rangamati District
1st Jatiya Sangsad members
Independent politicians in Bangladesh